The Allapalli grass skink or Schmidt's mabuya (Eutropis allapallensis) is a species of skink found in India.

Distribution
India (Kerala, Gujarat)
Type locality: Allapalli Forest, nr. Chanda, Central Provinces.

See also
Simpson-Roosevelts Asiatic Expedition

References

 Vyas, R. 2004 First record of Mabuya allapallensis from Gujarat State, India. Hamadryad 28 (1&2): 129-
 Das I. 1991 A new species of Mabuya from Tamil Nadu State, Southern India (Squamata: Scincidae). Journal of Herpetology 25 (3): 342–344.
 Schmidt, K.P. 1926 Amphibians and Reptiles of the James Simpson-Roosevelt Asiatic Expedition. Field Mus. nat. Hist., Zool. Ser. 12: 167-173
 Thomas, J., P. S. Easa & S. Jahas. 1998 Mabuya allapallensis Schmidt A new record for Kerala. Cobra 31: 16–18.
S. Bhupathy, A.M.A. Nixon and D. Mukherjee, Aspects of Ecology of Mabuya allapallensis (Schmidt, 1926) in Kolli Hills, Eastern Ghats, India. (Unpublished-Communicated for publication).

External links
 

Eutropis
Reptiles described in 1926
Reptiles of India
Endemic fauna of India
Taxa named by Karl Patterson Schmidt